Großer Brückentinsee is a lake in the Mecklenburgische Seenplatte district in Mecklenburg-Vorpommern, Germany. At an elevation of 59.9 m, its surface area is 1.34 km².

External links 
 

Lakes of Mecklenburg-Western Pomerania
LGrosserBruckentinsee